Redmond Christopher Fernandez Domingo (born August 15, 1985), known professionally as Cogie Domingo, is a Filipino actor and model.

Career
At age 13, he joined the cast of ABS-CBN's Cyberkada. This was followed by Regal Films' horror flick, Sa Piling ng mga Aswang (1999), in which he starred opposite Maricel Soriano. His next project was Jose Javier Reyes' Yakapin Mo ang Umaga (2000), where he played son to Christopher de Leon and Lorna Tolentino. But what was his most memorable is his lead portrayal of the juvenile prisoner in the award-winning filmfest entry, Deathrow in 2000, in which he co-starred with Eddie Garcia and was coached by director Joel Lamangan. He also starred in different television shows such as Ikaw Lang ang Mamahalin with Angelika dela Cruz, Kung Mawawala Ka with Sunshine Dizon and Bakekang with Lovi Poe.

His career began in ABS-CBN at 1993 at the age of 8, as first seen in Star Drama Presents. In 1999, he moved to GMA Network until 2006.

He went back to showbiz, returned to ABS-CBN, appearing in Maalaala Mo Kaya after being out for almost four years since 2010.

Domingo moved to TV5, appears in Inday Wanda, P. S. I Love You and Valiente. After 3 years, Domingo left TV5.

In 2015, he appeared in GMA Network again as joining the cast of Buena Familia starring Angelu de Leon, Bobby Andrews, Kylie Padilla, Julie Anne San Jose, Julian Trono and Mona Louise Rey.

His appearance on ABS-CBN in 2016, is Ipaglaban Mo!. Domingo's final drama appearance at GMA Network is Someone to Watch Over Me.

Domingo made his return after two-year hiatus, but his appearance on ABS-CBN in 2019 is FPJ's Ang Probinsyano who portrayed as Captain Eric Opeña.

Personal life
Domingo is the son of a lawyer. The actor was linked to different actresses like Anne Curtis, Angel Locsin, Sunshine Dizon, and Lovi Poe. In September 2009, it was reported in the news that he had an affair with Rachel Tiongson while she was still cohabiting with politician and businessman Chavit Singson. On 11 March 2016, Domingo married his long-time girlfriend, Ria Sacasas, in an intimate ceremony. Domingo has one daughter with a former girlfriend.

On October 27, 2017, Domingo and two other persons were arrested by PDEA for possession of illegal drugs. Three days later, Domingo was allowed by PDEA to post bail; he remain imprisoned until November 2017.

Filmography

Television

Movies

References

External links
Cogie Domingo at iGMA.tv

1985 births
Living people
Filipino male child actors
Filipino male models
Male actors from Manila
Filipino people of Spanish descent
GMA Network personalities